Günter Litfin (19 January 1937 – 24 August 1961) was a German tailor who became the second known person to die at the Berlin Wall. Litfin was the first victim to be killed by East German border troops, the first to succumb to gunshot wounds, and was the first male victim.

Biography
Günter Litfin was born on 19 January 1937 in Berlin, Nazi Germany, along with a twin brother, Alois, who was murdered by a Nazi physician during the Second World War. 
Litfin lived in East Germany, in the borough of Weißensee of East Berlin, and like his father Albert (a butcher) was a member of the illegal local branch of the Christian Democrats Union, the centre-right West German political party. A tailor by trade, Litfin was a Grenzgänger (cross-border commuter) working near the Zoological Garden in West Berlin. On 13 August 1961, the border between East Berlin and West Berlin was abruptly closed by East Germany, effectively trapping him in East Berlin. Shortly before the border was closed, Litfin had found an apartment in Charlottenburg, West Berlin, closer to his workplace, and on 12 August, only the day before, he had driven to Charlottenburg with his brother Jürgen to furnish his new apartment. Litfin's intention to escape East Germany was abruptly halted the next morning, as road blocks had already been placed and the first barbed wire fences of the Berlin Wall were built.

Death
On 24 August, at around 4 pm, Litfin attempted to illegally escape by swimming from Humboldthafen, a small harbour in the River Spree, on a planned route through a small canal branching off from the river westwards into West Berlin. However, upon crossing the railway bridge that constituted the border, Litfin was discovered by officers of the East German transportation police, and was ordered to immediately swim back. Litfin lifted his hands from the water to exit the river on the West Berlin side, and was then shot and killed.

Litfin was buried at the St. Hedwig Cemetery, in Weißensee, on 31 August 1961. The presence of Stasi personnel at the burial ensured that the truth behind his death was not openly revealed. According to his brother Jürgen, the funeral was "a farce" since most at the mourning knew that his brother's death was no accident, and that he had been killed for trying to leave East Germany.

Aftermath
In memory of Günter Litfin, as well as all other victims of the Wall, a memorial was established in 1992 on the initiative of Jürgen Litfin (Günter Litfin's younger brother). It is located in the watchtower of the former "Kieler Eck" on the Berlin-Spandauer Schifffahrtskanal. In addition, on 24 August 2000, the Weißensee street formerly named Straße 209 was renamed Günter-Litfin-Straße. Additionally, a street in his home district of Weißensee was named after him. One of the crosses at the White Crosses memorial site next to the Reichstag building is devoted to him.

After the fall of the Berlin Wall and the subsequent reunification of East and West Germany, the Berlin Regional Court found the border guard accused of shooting Litfin to be guilty of manslaughter, and sentenced him to 18 months prison, which was suspended.

Gallery

See also 
 List of deaths at the Berlin Wall
 Berlin Crisis of 1961

References

Literature
 Jürgen Litfin: Tod durch fremde Hand. Das erste Maueropfer in Berlin und die Geschichte einer Familie. Verlag der Nation, Husum 2006, .
 Mathias Mesenhöller: Die grausame Mauer. In: Geo, 08/2011, S. 73
 Christine Brecht: Günter Litfin, in: Die Todesopfer an der Berliner Mauer 1961–1989. Ein biographisches Handbuch. Links, Berlin 2009, p. 37–39.

External links

1937 births
1961 deaths
Deaths at the Berlin Wall
People from East Berlin
Deaths by firearm in East Germany
1960s in Berlin
German twins
People from Pankow
East German defectors